Tamzara is a folk dance native to Armenian Highlands. It is today performed by Armenians, Assyrians, Azerbaijanis (in the regions of Sharur, Nakhchivan and parts of Iranian Azerbaijan), and Greeks.

The word Tamzara means "half gilt" or "half decoration". The women dancing used to wear golden items including necklaces, beads, rings, ear-rings and  other jewelry and those women expressed beauty and brightness, to which the name alludes.

This dance was also especially popular in the formerly Armenian-populated regions of Erzincan, Erzurum, Kigi, Arapgir, Harput, and Malatya. There are many versions of Tamzara, with slightly different music and steps, coming from the various regions and old villages in the Armenian Highlands.

History and description
Legend has it that the dance was brought to Armenia by the ancient Assyrians during their conquest of the region in the Assyrian Empire in commemoration to the god of food and vegetation Tammuz.

The meaning of this dance, which is famous in the villages of Charchibogan, Chomakhtur and other villages of Nakhchivan's Sharur region, is "Gizili tanbatan" (half golden) in word-by-word translation. Tamzara is included to the repertoire of the folklore dancing collectives respectively. The women dancing used to dress luxuriously and adorn themselves with golden accessories, including rings, ear-rings, bracelets, chains and others.

In 2018, Azerbaijani-style Tamzara, along with Yalli and Kochari, was inscribed into the UNESCO List of Intangible Cultural Heritage in need of urgent safeguarding.

Style

All Tamzaras have the unique  rhythm, with the two accented beats at the end of each measure. In addition, the melody to most Tamzaras is very similar, though there are exceptions. Like most folk dances of the Armenian Highlands, Tamzara is done as a line dance or circle dance, with a large group of people with interlocked pinkies. However one version of the Tamzara is done by a man with one or two women standing shoulder to shoulder facing the same direction with their arms around each other's waists.

Tamzara is one of the most popular Armenian folk dances to have been preserved in the United States by the Armenian-American community.

See also
An Dro
Faroese dance
Kalamatianos
Khigga
Syrtos
Yalli

References

External links
Armenian Tamzara by Karin Folk Ensemble
Authentic Tamzara from Historical Armenia performed by Armenian Folk Dance Society. The Armenian Folk Dance Society performed at the 1939 and 1964 World's Fair in New York.
 Greek Tamsara, Tamzara
 Armenian Davul-Zurna Tamzara     (2) sample
 Armenian Tamzara by Richard Hagopian, Fresno California

Assyrian dances
Greek dances
Armenian dances
Azerbaijani dances
Circle dances